Phloeotribus is a genus of crenulate bark beetles in the family Curculionidae. There are at least 150 described species in Phloeotribus.

See also
 List of Phloeotribus species

References

Further reading

External links

 

Scolytinae
Articles created by Qbugbot